Francisco Sánchez Barbero (1764–1819) was a Spanish erudite, journalist, poet and writer.

New Latin-language writers
People from the Province of Salamanca
1764 births
1819 deaths
University of Salamanca alumni
18th-century Spanish journalists